Duke of Rohan is a title of French nobility, associated with the Breton region of Rohan.

Duke of Rohan

House of Rohan

House of Chabot

House of Rohan-Chabot

The title prince de Léon is used a courtesy title until the succession of the duke.

See also 
 House of Rohan

References and notes

House of Rohan
House of Rohan-Chabot